WrayGunn are a Portuguese band formed in Coimbra, in early 1999. Their music is a mix of rock, soul, gospel and blues. Paulo Furtado (lead guitar and vocals) says their sound is something like Elvis singing in a space shuttle. Other members of the group are Raquel Ralha (vocals), Sérgio Cardoso (bass guitar), Francisco Correia (sampler), Pedro Pinto (drums), Selma Uamusse (vocals), João Doce (drums). In 2008, the band was nominated in the category "best Portuguese band" for the "Globos de Ouro".

Discography 
  "Amateur" (2000)
  "Soul Jam" (2001)
  "Ecclesiastes" 1.11 (2005)
  "Shangri-la" (2007)
 L´Art Brut (2012)

External links 
 Official site
 Billboard.com
 Myspace

References 

Portuguese rock music groups
1999 establishments in Portugal
Musical groups established in 1999
Culture in Coimbra